James Moore Bloomer (born 22 August 1947) is a Scottish former professional footballer who played as a defender. His father, also named Jimmy, also played for Grimsby Town.

References

1947 births
Living people
Footballers from Glasgow
Scottish footballers
Association football defenders
Grimsby Town F.C. players
Worksop Town F.C. players
Grantham Town F.C. players
English Football League players